Des de Moor (born 20 April 1961 in Ipswich, Suffolk, England) is a writer, singer, musician and songwriter. His first performance in front of a paying audience was in Hertford, Hertfordshire, England in June 1976. He worked with local bands and performed in folk clubs in the Hertford area during the late 1970s and 1980s before moving to London in 1985. In 1987 he formed The Irresistible Force with Morris Gould aka Mixmaster Morris, releasing two singles and several remixes and performing in Britain and the Netherlands.

After dissolving his partnership with Gould late in 1989, de Moor re-emerged in 1993 as an acoustic performer specialising in European-influenced chanson, theatre song and musical cabaret. In December 1995 he launched Pirate Jenny's club at the Vortex Jazz Club in London, presenting other artists specialising in this style of music. The club transferred to The Drill Hall, London, in 2004.

Apart from Pirate Jenny's, de Moor's best known work to date is Darkness and Disgrace, an adaptation of David Bowie songs in cabaret/chanson style created in collaboration with pianist Russell Churney, originally performed in 2001 and recorded in 2003 (see Darkness and Disgrace: Des de Moor and Russell Churney Perform the Songs of David Bowie.

De Moor has worked with chansonniers Barb Jungr, Robb Johnson, Leon Rosselson, pianist David Harrod and double bass player Julia Doyle.

He is also a translator who has written accurate English translations of songs by Jacques Brel, Léo Ferré, Claude Nougaro, Barbara (Monique Serf), Bertolt Brecht and Wannes Van de Velde.

De Moor is also known for several other activities. Between 1996 and 2006 he was a regular DJ at the 100 Club, London, though playing vintage swing, R&B, soul and ska rather than chanson or cabaret.

He is a beer writer, writing regularly for Campaign for Real Ale publications and others. In 2010 he contributed to the book 1001 Beers You Must Try Before You Die (edited by Adrian Tierney-Jones, Quintessence) and in 2011 published his own first book, The CAMRA Guide to London's Best Beer, Pubs and Bars (CAMRA Books). A second edition of this appeared in 2015 and a third in 2022.

He has also written on walking for the Ramblers' Association, among other work compiling evidence on walking and health.

de Moor has a degree in the Humanities, having taken honours in Philosophy, Hegelian Dialectics, Semantics. Discourse Analysis and Linguistics.

Politics

de Moor has a history of radical political engagement both around specific causes and in general politics.  He was involved in Lesbian and Gay Rights campaigns through the 1980s and 1990s.  He was active in the Lesbian and Gay Youth Movement and for a period was a supporter of what would later be characterised as platformist anarcho-communist groups.

Partly under the influence of veteran Gay political activist Don Milligan, de Moor became a supporter of the Revolutionary Communist Party in the mid-1980s but left the party before its dissolution. His early work ( A Bloody Row),much influenced by Michael Moorcock, and industrial music, features songs and J. G. Ballardian , dystopian lyrics dedicated to Anarchist Nestor Makhno and the Makhnovshchina.

Discography

Albums

Solo albums
A Bloody Row (1982)
Photographs in Empty Houses (1992)
Margins (1994)
Water of Europe (1999)
Testing Times (forthcoming)

Other albums
Various artists
The Tempest 2 (1982)
Various artists
Hartforde Poets 10th Birthday Party (1982)
Various artists
Ne Me Quitte Pas: Brel Songs by... (1998)
Various artists
Nine Times Two (2002)
Des de Moor and Russell Churney
Darkness and Disgrace: Des de Moor and Russell Churney Perform the Songs of David Bowie (2003)

Singles
Lloyd Cole and the Commotions
My Bag (1987)
The Irresistible Force
I Want To (1988)
Stump
Charlton Heston (1988)
Edward II and the Red Hot Polkas
Edward II and the Mad Professor Take a Trip to Sweden to Polka Steady with the Irresistible Force in a Rub-a-Dub Stylee at 90bpm (1989)
The Irresistible Force
Freestyle (1989)
Sofrito
The Spice of Life (1990)
Edward II
Dashing Away (1992)

References

External links
 Official website
 Beer Culture website
 Entry on British Guild of Beer Writers website

English male singers
1961 births
Living people
Musicians from Ipswich
English songwriters
Singers from London
British male songwriters